In human anatomy, the axillary artery is a large blood vessel that conveys oxygenated blood to the lateral aspect of the thorax, the axilla (armpit) and the upper limb.  Its origin is at the lateral margin of the first rib, before which it is called the subclavian artery.

After passing the lower margin of teres major it becomes the brachial artery.

Structure
The axillary artery is often referred to as having three parts, with these divisions based on its location relative to the Pectoralis minor muscle, which is superficial to the artery.  
 First part – the part of the artery superior to the pectoralis minor
 Second part – the part of the artery posterior to the pectoralis minor
 Third part – the part of the artery inferior to the pectoralis minor.

Relations
The axillary artery is accompanied by the axillary vein, which lies medial to the artery, along its length.

In the axilla, the axillary artery is surrounded by the brachial plexus. The second part of the axillary artery is the reference for the locational descriptions of the cords in the brachial plexus.  For example, the posterior cord of the brachial plexus is so named because it lies posterior to the second part of the artery.

Branches

The axillary artery has several smaller branches. The branches can be remembered, in order, when traveling from the heart, with the mnemonics "Screw The Lawyers Save A Patient", "Summertime: The Lakers Schedule Another Parade", "Sixties Teens Love Sex And Pot", or "She Tastes Like Sweet Apple Pie."   The origin of these branches is highly variable (e.g. the posterior and anterior circumflex arteries often have a common trunk). An arterial branch is named for its course, not its origin.

 First part (1 branch)
 Superior thoracic artery (Supreme thoracic artery)
 Second part (2 branches)
 Thoraco-acromial artery
 Lateral thoracic artery.  If the lateral thoracic artery is not branching from the axillary artery, will most likely branch from the following (in order of likelihood): (1) thoracoacromial, (2) third part of axillary artery, (3) suprascapular artery, (4) subscapular artery
 Third part (3 branches)
 Subscapular artery
 Anterior humeral circumflex artery
 Posterior humeral circumflex artery

Continues as the brachial artery past the inferior border of the teres major.

Clinical significance

The axillary artery can be safely clamped without endangering the arm, but only in a location proximal to the origin of the subscapular artery (and distal to the thyrocervical trunk of the subclavian artery). The anastomotic network surrounding the scapula provides an alternate path for collateral circulation to the arm from arteries including the dorsal scapular artery and suprascapular artery.

The right axillary artery is often used as an arterial cannulation site in cardiac surgery, particularly for repair of aortic dissection and replacement of the ascending aorta and aortic arch.

Additional images

References

External links

 
 
  – "Axillary Region: Parts of the Axillary Artery"
  – "The axillary artery and its major branches shown in relation to major landmarks."

Arteries of the upper limb